Griff Barnett (born Manley Griffith, November 12, 1884 – January 12, 1958) was an American actor.

Barnett was born in Blue Ridge, Texas in 1884. 

In the early 20th century, Barnett was a member of the Mack-Hillard stock theater company in Wichita, Kansas. He also worked with stock theater companies in the Chicago area.

He played the role of the Rexall family druggist in commercials on The Phil Harris-Alice Faye Show on radio in the late 1940s and early 1950s.  He also appeared in numerous films from the 1930s through the 1950s, including To Each His Own (1946), Apartment for Peggy (1948), and Pinky (1949). He frequently played doctors or lawyers. In 1954, he appeared in episode 131 of the TV series, The Lone Ranger.

Barnett died of pneumonia and heart trouble at home in El Monte, California, on January 12, 1958, aged 73. He is buried in Rose Hills Memorial Park in Whittier, California.

Selected filmography

The Lone Ranger (1938, Serial) - Rancher (uncredited)
Santa Fe Stampede (1938) - Townsman Henry Jones (uncredited)
The Lone Ranger Rides Again (1939, Serial) - E.B. Tully (Ch. 6) (uncredited)
Those High Grey Walls (1939) - Prison Tailor (uncredited)
The Shadow (1940, Serial) - Stephen Prescott (uncredited)
Frontier Vengeance (1940) - Joel Hunter
Arizona (1940) - Sam Hughes
The Lady from Cheyenne (1941) - Cork Supporter (uncredited)
Bachelor Daddy (1941) - Bailiff (uncredited)
Gangs of Sonora (1941) - Man on Stagecoach (uncredited)
Outlaws of Cherokee Trail (1941) - Jury Foreman (uncredited)
Death Valley Outlaws (1941) - Train Agent (uncredited)
A Missouri Outlaw (1941) - Man with Ward (uncredited)
Dick Tracy vs. Crime, Inc. (1941, Serial) - Plant Watchman (uncredited)
Stardust on the Sage (1942) - Larkin (uncredited)
The Sombrero Kid (1942) - Townsman (uncredited)
Shadows on the Sage (1942) - Steve Jackson
The Story of Dr. Wassell (1944) - 'Janssen' Passenger (uncredited)
Wilson (1944) - Reporter (uncredited)
Strange Holiday (1945) - Regan
To Each His Own (1946) - Daniel Norris
Without Reservations (1946) - Train Conductor (uncredited)
Danger Woman (1946) - Dr. George Carey
Duel in the Sun (1946) - The Bordertown Jailer (uncredited)
The Arnelo Affair (1947) - Mr. Adams (uncredited)
Suddenly It's Spring (1947) - Conductor on Train (uncredited)
The Michigan Kid (1947) - Prentiss Dawson
The Millerson Case (1947) - Doc Sam Millerson
Possessed (1947) - Coroner
Stepchild (1947) - Burns
Gunfighters (1947) - Mr. Banner
The Son of Rusty (1947) - Judge (uncredited)
Unconquered (1947) - Brother Andrews - of Pennsylvania
Wild Harvest (1947) - Rankin
Magic Town (1947) - Henry - Stringer's Office (uncredited)
Cass Timberlane (1947) - Herman, the Butler
The Gangster (1947) - Dorothy's Father (uncredited)
Daisy Kenyon (1947) - Will Thompson (uncredited)
The Tender Years (1948) - Sen. Cooper
Arch of Triumph (1948) - Fernand (uncredited)
Saigon (1948) - Surgeon
Fury at Furnace Creek (1948) - Appleby
Fighting Father Dunne (1948) - Governor
Tap Roots (1948) - Dr. MacIntosh
The Walls of Jericho (1948) - Judge Hutto
For the Love of Mary (1948) - Timothy Peppertree
Apartment for Peggy (1948) - Dr. Philip Conway
Criss Cross (1949) - Pop
Mother Is a Freshman (1949) - Dean Gillingham
The Doolins of Oklahoma (1949) - Deacon Burton
The Fountainhead (1949) - Judge (uncredited)
Any Number Can Play (1949) - Police Desk Sergeant (uncredited)
Pinky (1949) - Dr. Joseph 'Doc Joe' McGill
Holiday Affair (1949) - Mr. Ennis
No Man of Her Own (1950) - Dr. Parker
Sierra (1950) - Dr. Hank Robbins
Customs Agent (1950) - Charles McGraw
Peggy (1950) - Dr. Philip Wilcox
Convicted (1950) - Mr. Hufford (uncredited)
When I Grow Up (1951) - Dr. Bailey
Home Town Story (1951) - Uncle Cliff
Two of a Kind (1951) - William McIntyre
Passage West (1951) - Papa Emil Ludwig
Cattle Drive (1951) - Conductor O'Hara
Scandal Sheet (1952) - Judge Elroy Hacker
The Treasure of Lost Canyon (1952) - Judge Wade
The Marrying Kind (1952) - Charley
The Sellout (1952) - J.R. Morrison
The Duel at Silver Creek (1952) - Dan 'Pop' Muzik (uncredited)
Angel Face (1953) - The Judge
The Court-Martial of Billy Mitchell (1955) - George Carlson (uncredited)
The Spirit of St. Louis (1957) - Dad (Farmer) (uncredited) (final film role)

References

External links
 

1884 births
1958 deaths
20th-century American male actors
People from El Monte, California
Male actors from Texas
Burials at Rose Hills Memorial Park
American male radio actors
American male film actors
American male stage actors
People from Collin County, Texas